The 1994 Labatt Brier, Canada's national men's curling championship, was held from March 5 to 13 at the Centrium in Red Deer, Alberta. 

In the final, former Brier champion Rick Folk of British Columbia, who won the Brier in 1980 representing Saskatchewan, defeated Russ Howard of Ontario to win his second Brier title, by a score of 8–5. The game was a re-match of the 1993 Labatt Brier, which saw Howard defeat Folk. In the game, the two teams traded singles in the first two ends. Ontario took a 2–1 lead in the third, after when B.C.'s third Bert Gretzinger missed his shots, leading to a steal of one for Ontario. However, B.C. rebounded with a three-ender in the fourth when Howard wrecked on a guard with his final shot, and Folk made an open draw to score three. In the fifth, Folk make a come-around raise to lie three on his last. Howard's final shot came up a bit short, giving up a steal of two. Ontario tried in vain to come back, scoring two in the sixth, but it was too little too late, with Folk eventually claiming victory. After the game, Howard called the Folk rink "uptight", as Folk did not engage with him for much of the game.  There was also some controversy before the game, as the Folk rink chose to pick the same set of rocks that the Howard rink had already carefully chosen for their semifinal match, and had intended to use for the final. After finishing first in the round robin, Folk's team had the privilege of having first selection of rocks. Team Folk countered that the Howard team had broken a rule by selecting rocks of different colours (and changing their handles). 

With the win, Folk became the first person to have won the Brier for two different provinces, and it was the longest time between two Brier victories (14 years) for a skip since Ab Gowanlock's 15 year gap between 1938 and 1953. It was the first Brier title for B.C. in 30 years. With the win, Folk and his rink would go on to represent Canada at the 1994 World Men's Curling Championship. 

The 1994 Brier is remembered primarily for the antagonistic relationship between the mostly Albertan crowd and the Ontario team. This led it to be dubbed the "redneck brier" by some media commentators.

Teams

Round-robin standings

Round-robin results

Draw 1

Draw 2

Draw 3

Draw 4

Draw 5

Draw 6

Draw 7

Draw 8

Draw 9

Draw 10

Draw 11

Draw 12

Draw 13

Draw 14

Draw 15

Draw 16

Draw 17

Playoffs

Semifinal

Final

Statistics

Top 5 player percentages 
Round Robin only

Team percentages 
Round Robin only

References

External links 
CCA Stats Archive – 1994 Labatt Brier 

The Brier
Sports competitions in Red Deer, Alberta
1994 in Canadian curling
Curling competitions in Alberta
1994 in Alberta